Liza Nerelyn Helder (born 1989) is an Aruban model and beauty pageant titleholder who was crowned Miss Aruba 2012 and was represented her Aruba in the 2012 Miss Universe pageant.

Miss Universe 2012
She represented Aruba in Miss Universe 2012 held on 19 December 2012.

References

External links
Official Miss Aruba website

Aruban beauty pageant winners
Aruban female models
Living people
Miss Universe 2012 contestants
1989 births
People from Santa Cruz, Aruba